Frisilia thapsina is a moth in the family Lecithoceridae. It was described by Chun-Sheng Wu and Kyu-Tek Park in 1999. It is found in Sri Lanka.

The wingspan is 10–12 mm. The forewings are light yellow with a silky sheen and a dark brown pattern. The hindwings are ochreous.

Etymology
The species name is derived from Greek thapsinos (meaning yellow).

References

Moths described in 1999
Frisilia